François Maurice Le Sieur is a Canadian musician and composer. He has been nominated for awards for television and film music in his native Canada, that include garnering seven Gemini award wins and thirteen additional nominations; one Genie award nomination; and three Jutra award nominations.

Life and work
He studied at Collège Marguerite-Bourgeoys and at McGill University, where he became inspired from a master class with Philip Glass. In the 1980s he was part of the rock band Tango Tango, before moving into television and film scoring.

His career has spanned over fifteen years, and his other work includes Tony and Ridley Scott’s series The Hunger starring David Bowie; the films of Alain DesRochers, his long-time collaborator, beginning with The Bottle (La Bouteille); and television series Musée Eden, Nos Étés, Music Hall, Les Soeurs Elliot, Les Bougon, and Charlie Jade, an international co-production filmed in South Africa.

Le Sieur scored three films that premiered in 2011: drama Thrill of the Hills (Frisson des collines); comedy A Sense of Humour (Le sens de l'humour); and biopic of Quebec rock star Gerry Boulet, Gerry, for which Le Sieur remastered Boulet’s original tracks.

Le Sieur won an ASCAP award in 2012 for his work on Being Human, a North American version of the British show of the same name.

Awards

References

External links

 

Canadian film score composers
Musicians from Quebec
People from Saint-Jean-sur-Richelieu
Living people
Canadian Screen Award winners
Year of birth missing (living people)